Dieni may refer to:

 Federica Dieni (born 1986), Italian politician
 Dieni railway station, Tujetsch, Switzerland